HMS Grimsby was a  of the British Royal Navy, and the second ship to bear the name.

Construction and design

She was built by Vosper Thornycroft, in Woolston, Hampshire, and commissioned in 1999. The class was originally named as the Single Role Minehunter and was planned to complement the capabilities of the preceding  and to be cheaper to build. Sandown-class MCMVs are highly manoeuvrable vessels due to being fitted with Voith-Schneider propulsors allowing rapid turning at slow speeds or whilst stationary. Armament is primarily for self-defence against an asymmetric warfare threat although a point defence capability exists. The fit of two Mk44 miniguns has greatly improved the ship's force protection ability.

Service history

Grimsby was part of Mine Counter Measures Squadron 1 based at HMNB Clyde, Faslane, on the Gare Loch.

At 2am on 29 September 2004 the 480-ton craft lost power and drifted into the ferry Duchess M (Gravesend to Tilbury), owned by the Lower Thames and Medway Passenger Boat Company in Gravesend, also damaging their Princess Pocahontas.

Overseas deployments were varied including regular participation in Exercise Cold Response (Norway) and as part of Standing NATO Force Mediterranean (Standing NATO Maritime Group 2). More recently the focus had been in support of OP TELIC Roulement in the Persian Gulf. 

In 2010 the ship was based in Bahrain. In 2012 she entered a six-month Support Period (Docking) at HMNB Rosyth which included replacing the entire fire detection system, upgraded communications systems and habitability improvements.

In early September 2022, the ship was reported as likely to be decommissioned and transferred to Ukraine and in October 2022 it was reported that her decommissioning had occurred.

Affiliations
She was affiliated to her home town of Grimsby, North East Lincolnshire and with local organisations such as Grimsby Town F.C., and the Grimsby and Cleethorpes Sea Cadet Unit. Other affiliations include the Grimsby Royal British Legion, Grimsby Royal Naval Association and Old Cleethorpes Royal Naval Association.

The ship's Lady Sponsor is Lady Blackham.

See also
 List of mine countermeasure vessels of the Royal Navy
 List of active Royal Navy ships

References

External links

 

Sandown-class minehunters
Ships built in Southampton
1998 ships
Minehunters of the United Kingdom
Military history of Grimsby